Articles (arranged alphabetically) related to Bhutan include:

A
AH48 (Asian Highway 48)
Atsara

B
Battle of Five Lamas
Bhutan Broadcasting Service
Bhutan Football Federation
Bhutan national cricket team
Bhutan national football team
Bhutan Postal Corporation
Bhutan Postal Museum
Bhutan Times
Bhutanese architecture
Bhutanese art
Bhutanese democracy
Bhutia
Black-necked crane
Blessed Rainy Day
Buddha Dordenma statue
Buddhism in Bhutan
Bumthang
Bumthangkha
Bön

C
Central Monk Body
Cham Dance
Chari Goemba
Chendebji Chorten
Chogyal Minjur Tempa
Chomo Lhari
Chorten
Chorten Kora
Culture of Bhutan

D
Demographics of Bhutan
Desi Druk
Doma
Dorje
Doya
Drangme Chhu
Driglam namzha
Druk
Drukair
Drukgyel Dzong
Drukpa
Drukpa Kunley
Dzong architecture
Dzongkha
Dzongkha keyboard layout

E
Economy of Bhutan
Emblem of Bhutan

F
Five-Year Plans of Bhutan
Foreign relations of Bhutan

G
Gangkar Puensum
Gangtey Monastery
Gasa
Gelephu
Geography of Bhutan
Gho
Gompa
Gross National Happiness

H
Haa
History of Bhutan

J
Jakar Dzong
Jambay Lhakhang
Je Khempo
Jigme Chhoeda
Jigme Dorji Wangchuck
Jigme Khesar Namgyel Wangchuck
Jigme Singye Wangchuck
Jigme Wangchuck

K
Kagyu
Karma Phuntsho
Kheng
Kings of Bhutan
Kira (dress)
Kuensel
Kula Kangri
Kurje Lhakhang
Kyichu Lhakhang

L
Lateral Road
Layap
Lepcha
LGBT rights in Bhutan (Gay rights)
Lhopu
Lhotshampa
Lhuntse
List of birds of Bhutan
List of mammals of Bhutan
Longchen Rabjampa
Lunana
Lyonpo Jigme Thinley
Lyonpo Khandu Wangchuk
Lyonpo Yeshey Zimba

M
Mangde Chhu
Membartsho
Memorial Chorten
Military of Bhutan
Mo Chhu
Mongar
Music of Bhutan

N
National Assembly of Bhutan
National Council of Bhutan
National Museum of Bhutan
Ngalop
Ngawang Namgyal
Ngultrum
Norling Drayang
Nyingma

P
Padmasambhava
Paro
Paro Dzong
Paro Taktsang (Tiger's Nest Monastery)
Pemagatshel
Pema Lingpa
Phajoding Monastery
Phobjika valley
Pho Chhu
Phuentsholing
Politics of Bhutan
Postage stamps and postal history of Bhutan
Prayer flag
Proverbs of Bhutan
Punakha
Punakha Dzong

R
Rigsar
Rinpung Dzong
Royal Bhutan Army
Royal University of Bhutan

S
Sangay Khandu
Samdrup Jongkhar
Samtse
Sarpang
Shabdrung
Shabdrung Ngawang Namgyal
Sharchops
Sherubtse College
Squatting in Bhutan
Suicide in Bhutan

T
Tamzhing Monastery
Tashi Peljor
Tashichho Dzong
Thimphu
Thongdrel
Tibetan Buddhism
Transport in Bhutan
Trashigang
Trashiyangtse District
Trongsa
Tsa Yig
Tshangla language
Tshechu
Tshering Chhoden
Tshering Tobgay
Tsirang District

U
Ugyen Wangchuck

W
Wangdue Phodrang

Y
Yeti

Z
Zhabdrung Rinpoche
Zhemgang
Zangmo, Neten

See also

 Lists of country-related topics

Bhutan